The Sheffield Sharks, currently known as "B.Braun Sheffield Sharks" for sponsorship reasons, are a professional basketball team from the city of Sheffield, South Yorkshire, England. The Sharks play in the British Basketball League and play their home fixtures at Ponds Forge. They are one of the most successful teams in the history of British basketball, second only to Newcastle Eagles, and dominated the domestic scene throughout the 1990s and early 2000s.

Franchise history

History as "Forgers"
The franchise was established in 1991 when the team, then called the Sheffield Forgers in reference to the city's history as a major steel producer, were admitted to National Basketball League Division 2. After two seasons competing in the division, with an overall 26–16 record, the Forgers were crowned Champions in 1993 and promoted to NBL Division 1.

The 1993–1994 season would prove to be another successful one for the Forgers having reached the National Trophy final where they beat Plymouth Raiders 62–60 on "home" territory at the Sheffield Arena. Their stay in the First Division did not last long, and although they finished in 4th position with a 10–8 record, the Forgers were admitted to the professional top-tier British Basketball League to replace the withdrawing Guildford Kings.

Rename to Sharks
The successful franchise was purchased by the Chrysalis Group in 1994 and rebranded as Sheffield Sharks. On court, the team dominated the league in its rookie season, and with a 29–7 league record, marched on to take the BBL League Championship and National Cup with an incredible 89–66 victory in the final against Thames Valley Tigers. However the Tigers got their revenge over the Sharks with a nail-biting 74–69 win in the BBL Trophy final. The Sharks also missed out on the playoff final following a 72–84 loss to Worthing Bears in the Final Four, despite this the Sheffield team still enjoyed a phenomenal debut season.

European leagues
In 1995, the 1995 McDonald's Championship came to London and the Sharks were entered as the host team, mixing with the elite of world basketball including the NBA's Houston Rockets, Spanish League giants Real Madrid and Bologna of the Italian League amongst others. Sheffield finished the series 0–2, following defeats to Real Madrid and Maccabi Tel Aviv.

Sharks' adventure continued into Europe in the following season (1995–96) when they competed in the prestigious Euroleague. After knocking out Luxembourg-based team Residence Helmsange in the qualifying round, the Sharks were then eliminated in the first round by Real Madrid after a 57–67 defeat in Sheffield and a 75–78 defeat in Madrid. As a result of losing, Sheffield were then placed in the Third Round of the less glamorous European Cup, where they were subsequently knocked out by Belgian League club Oostende Basket, thus ending their European adventure.

On the domestic scene, the Sharks could not repeat the highs of their previous season, finishing as Runners-up in the League Championship (30–6) to London Towers, and losing the final of the National Cup 58–70 also to the dominating Towers. Their playoff dreams were also shattered in the semifinals by eventual winners Birmingham Bullets, whom they lost to 68–82.

Golden Era
The Sharks again reached the BBL Cup final in 1996 and 1997, finishing second then third in the championship, and their next piece of silverware was the 1998 BBL Trophy. They claimed their second BBL Cup and championship double in 1999, with Terrell Myers picked as League MVP, before successfully defending the Cup in 2000 after reaching their fifth Cup final in six years. It was during the most successful period of the clubs’ history that owners Chrysalis Group decided to sell off their majority stake. After running into off-court financial difficulties and on the brink of a wind-up order from the BBL, the franchise was acquired by Montgomery Leisure Services Ltd in 2001, the same year that a first Play-off final appearance was secured in after topping the championship. However it was Leicester Riders who triumphed 84–75, and the Sharks were beaten again in the play-off final the following year, 93–82 by Cheshire Jets. The Sharks claimed their third Championship in five years in 2003 and although they failed to reach the play-off final, they got there the following year after a second-placed league finish. It was the Sharks' third playoff final in four years and a case of third time lucky as they beat Cheshire 86–74.

Modern era
In the 2009–2010 season, Sheffield won the BBL Cup for the first time in six years beating the Cheshire Jets 89–86. During the 2010–2011 season, they successfully defended their cup victory by beating the Mersey Tigers 93–66 and also made it to the final of the playoffs but were beaten out by Mersey Tigers 79–74. In the 2012–2013 season, the Sharks won the BBL Trophy for the first time in 15 years beating the Leicester Riders 71–69. In the 2015–2016 season, Sheffield made it to the Play Off final for the first time in five years. This time however, for the first time in 12 years the Sharks in the final of the playoffs on 8 May 2016, beat Leicester Riders 84–77.

Home arenas
Sheffield Arena (1994–2004)
Ponds Forge (2004–2006)
English Institute of Sport, Sheffield (2006–2019)
Ponds Forge (2019–present)

Season-by-season records

Notes:
Until 1993 Division Three operated as the third tier league, behind Division Two and Division One (the BBL).
In 1993 the NBL restructured Division Two as Division One, operating as the second tier league.
From 1999–2002 the BBL operated a Conference system. Sheffield competed in the Northern Conference.

Trophies

League
 NBL Division 2 Winners: 1992/93 1
 BBL Winners: 1994/95, 1998/99, & 2002/03 3
 BBL Northern Conference Winners: 2000/01 1
 BBL Runners Up: 1995/96, 2003/04, & 2009/10, 2013/14 4
 BBL Northern Conference Runners Up: 1999/00, & 2001/02 2

Playoffs
 NBL Division 2 Play Off Winners: 1992/93 1
 BBL Play Off Winners: 2003/04, & 2015/16 (2)
 BBL Play Off Runners Up: 2000/01, 2001/02, 2010/11 (3)

Cup
 National Cup Winners: 1994/95, 1998/99, & 1999/00 3
 BBL Cup Winners: 2003/04, 2009/10 & 2010/11 3
 National Cup Runners Up: 1995/96, & 1996/97  2

Trophy
 BBL Trophy Winners: 1993/1994, 1997/1998, & 2012/13 3
 BBL Trophy Runners Up: 1994/95, 2017/18  2

Players

Current roster

Notable former players

 John Amaechi
 Olu Babalola
 Andrew Bridge
 Fabulous Flournoy
 Nate Reinking
 Chris Sanders
 Peter Scantlebury
 Voise Winters
 James Whyte
 Marshall Brown
 Jeff Bonds
 Travis Conlan
 Mike Cook
 Sterling Davis
 Chris Finch
 Matt Krasnoff
 Andre McCloud
 Jeff Monaco
 Terrell Myers
 Lynard Stewart
 Dirk Williams Jr
 Robert Yanders

Ownership
Steve Shore
Yuri Matischen
Sarah Backovic
Karen Child
John Timms 
Atiba Lyons

See also
Basketball in England
British Basketball League
Euroleague
National Basketball League
Sheffield Arena

References

External links

Sheffield Sharks on Facebook

 
Basketball teams established in 1991
1991 establishments in England
Sports teams and clubs in Sheffield
Basketball teams in England
British Basketball League teams